The Victorian Premier's Prize for Writing for Young Adults, formerly known as the Victorian Premier's Prize for Young Adult Fiction, is a prize category in the annual Victorian Premier's Literary Award. As of 2011 it has an enumeration of 25,000. The winner of this category prize vies with 4 other category winners for overall Victorian Prize for Literature valued at an additional 100,000.

From inception in 1999 to 2010, the award was administered by the State Library of Australia and known as the Victorian Premier's Prize for Young Adult Fiction. In 2011 stewardship changed to the Wheeler Centre where the prize was re-launched with a new name, rules and prize amount. According to the State Library of Australia, "This prize [was] offered for a published work of fiction or collection of short stories written for a readership between the ages of 13 and 18. Publishers may consider submitting books that are appropriate to young adult readers but not published under a young adult imprint. Literary merit is the major judging criterion. In the case of illustrated books, the additional criterion of literary and artistic unity is considered."

Honorees

Victorian Premier's Prize for Young Adult Fiction

References 

Victorian Premier's Literary Awards
Young adult literature awards